This is a list of episodes of the third season of The Ellen DeGeneres Show, which aired from September 2005 to June 2006.

Episodes

References

External links
 

3
2005 American television seasons
2006 American television seasons